Acantharia is a genus of fungi in the Venturiaceae family.

Species
 Acantharia aterrima (Cooke & G. Winter) Arx (1954)
 Acantharia chaetomoides W.H. Hsieh, Chi Y. Chen & Sivan. (1995)
 Acantharia echinata (Ellis & Everh.) Theiss. & Syd. (1918)
 Acantharia elegans (Syd. & P. Syd.) Arx (1954)
 Acantharia hamata (Penz. & Sacc.) Arx (1954)
 Acantharia quercus-dilatatae S.K. Bose & E. Müll. (1965)
 Acantharia sinensis (Petr.) Arx (1954)

References

 Index Fungorum species listing

External links
Acantharia at Index Fungorum

Venturiaceae
Taxa named by Hans Sydow